Jackson Township is the name of forty-seven townships in the U.S. state of Indiana:

 Jackson Township, Allen County, Indiana
 Jackson Township, Bartholomew County, Indiana
 Jackson Township, Blackford County, Indiana
 Jackson Township, Boone County, Indiana
 Jackson Township, Brown County, Indiana
 Jackson Township, Carroll County, Indiana
 Jackson Township, Cass County, Indiana
 Jackson Township, Clay County, Indiana
 Jackson Township, Clinton County, Indiana
 Jackson Township, Dearborn County, Indiana
 Jackson Township, Decatur County, Indiana
 Jackson Township, DeKalb County, Indiana
 Jackson Township, Dubois County, Indiana
 Jackson Township, Elkhart County, Indiana
 Jackson Township, Fayette County, Indiana
 Jackson Township, Fountain County, Indiana
 Jackson Township, Greene County, Indiana
 Jackson Township, Hamilton County, Indiana
 Jackson Township, Hancock County, Indiana
 Jackson Township, Harrison County, Indiana
 Jackson Township, Howard County, Indiana
 Jackson Township, Huntington County, Indiana
 Jackson Township, Jackson County, Indiana
 Jackson Township, Jay County, Indiana
 Jackson Township, Kosciusko County, Indiana
 Jackson Township, Madison County, Indiana
 Jackson Township, Miami County, Indiana
 Jackson Township, Morgan County, Indiana
 Jackson Township, Newton County, Indiana
 Jackson Township, Orange County, Indiana
 Jackson Township, Owen County, Indiana
 Jackson Township, Parke County, Indiana
 Jackson Township, Porter County, Indiana
 Jackson Township, Putnam County, Indiana
 Jackson Township, Randolph County, Indiana
 Jackson Township, Ripley County, Indiana
 Jackson Township, Rush County, Indiana
 Jackson Township, Shelby County, Indiana
 Jackson Township, Spencer County, Indiana
 Jackson Township, Starke County, Indiana
 Jackson Township, Steuben County, Indiana
 Jackson Township, Sullivan County, Indiana
 Jackson Township, Tippecanoe County, Indiana
 Jackson Township, Washington County, Indiana
 Jackson Township, Wayne County, Indiana
 Jackson Township, Wells County, Indiana
 Jackson Township, White County, Indiana

Indiana township disambiguation pages